Kuehneosauridae is an extinct family of small, lizard-like gliding diapsids known from the Triassic period of Europe and North America. They are distinguished from other diapsids by their 'wings' formed by elongated ribs. These allowed the animal to glide and parachute similar to living gliding lizards. They were most likely insectivorous, judging from their pin-like teeth. They are often, but not always, placed in the group Lepidosauromorpha, though other studies have recovered them in other positions within Sauria, including Archosauromorpha. The oldest and most primitive known member is Pamelina from the Early Triassic (Olenekian stage) of Poland, which already has vertebrae with characteristics consistent with gliding or parachuting. Icarosaurus is known from a single specimen from the Carnian-aged Lockatong Formation of New Jersey. The Late Triassic (Norian stage) kuehneosaurids from England, Kuehneosaurus and Kuehneosuchus, are very similar and can be distinguished from one another primarily on the length of their "wing" ribs, relatively short and massive in Kuehneosaurus but longer and more gracile in Kuehneosuchus. Kuehneosaurus was likely only capable of parachuting, while Kuehneosuchus could probably glide. Rhabdopelix may have been a kuehneosaurid; however, the fossils were lost, and the characteristics described are not entirely consistent with the other family members.

The cladogram below follows a 2009 analysis by paleontologists Susan E. Evans and Magdalena Borsuk−Białynicka.

See also
Draco (genus)

References

Prehistoric reptile families
Prehistoric lepidosauromorphs
Triassic lepidosauromorphs
Olenekian first appearances
Norian extinctions
Taxa named by Alfred Romer